Events in the year 1964 in Turkey.

Parliament
 12th Parliament of Turkey

Incumbents
President – Cemal Gürsel
Prime Minister – İsmet İnönü
Leader of the opposition
 Ragıp Gümüşpala (up to 5 June)
Sadettin Bilgiç (acting, 5 June-29 November)
Süleyman Demirel (from 29 November)

Ruling party and the main opposition
  Ruling party – Republican People's Party (CHP) with Independents 
  Main opposition – Justice Party (AP)

Cabinet
28th government of Turkey

Events
 15 January – 31 January London Conference over the issue Cyprus (no consensus)
16 March – The government was authorized by the parliament for intervention to Cyprus 
31 May – Fenerbahçe won the championship of Turkish football league.
 4 June – US president Lyndon Johnson’s letter to İsmet İnönü concerning Cyprus issue (the content of the letter was revealed on 16 January 1966)
 7 June – Senate 1/3 by elections 
8 August – After Greek forces attacked Turkish positions in St Hilarion heights in Cyprus, Turkish air forces bombed Greek positions
 6 October - 1964 Manyas earthquake
 29 November – Süleyman Demirel was elected as the chairman of the Justice Party (AP)
 1 December – According to the Ankara Agreement, preparatory term for European Union membership began.

Births
23 March – Okan Bayülgen, showman and actor
6 July – Sadullah Ergin, former government minister
22 September – Hasan Basri Güzeloğlu, Vali (governor)
7 October – Yavuz Bingöl, singer
10 October – Suat Atalık, chess player
14 October – Neşe Erberk, model, business women
21 October – Levent Yüksel, singer
12 November – Semih Saygıner, professional carom billiards player
4 December – Sertap Erener, singer

Deaths
9 January – Halide Edib Adıvar (aged 80), novelist and a leader of Turkish women’s rights
3 June – Kazım Orbay (aged 60) retired general who participated in the Turkish War of Independence
5 June – Ragıp Gümüşpala (aged 67,) chairman of the Justice Party (AP) 
16 July – Rauf Orbay (aged 83), a former prime minister of the provisional Government of the Grand National Assembly 
25 November – Naci Tınaz (aged 82),  retired general who participated in the Turkish War of Independence

Gallery

See also
 1963–64 1.Lig
Turkey at the 1964 Summer Olympics
Turkey at the 1964 Winter Olympics

References

 
Years of the 20th century in Turkey
Turkey
Turkey
Turkey